Adam Booth is a British boxing trainer.

He boxed amateur at Winston Churchill ABC, Croydon ABC and the Lynn ABC. Approximately 40+ bouts.

Turned professional and suffered career ending injury prior to debut.

Biography
He is best known as the former trainer of English professional boxer, and former WBA heavyweight champion David Haye.

Booth has also trained and managed a number of other leading British and Irish talents including George Groves, Andy Lee, Danny Williams, Gary Logan and leading female fighter Cathy Brown. During a fight between Haye and Chisora, Booth was gashed in the head by a tripod that was thrown in his direction by Haye.
Booth was born in 1968 in South London. Adam Booth's nickname is Dark Lord for being very outspoken for a trainer.

His reputation as a physical trainer extends beyond boxing as he has also acted as a health consultant for Kylie Minogue.

His current stable of fighters includes Josh Kelly, Mick Conlan & Ellie Scotney

References

1969 births
British boxing trainers
Living people
British people of Turkish Cypriot descent
English male boxers